The Central Party School of the Chinese Communist Party, commonly known as the Central Party School, is the higher education institution which trains Chinese Communist Party (CCP) cadres. It is located in Haidian District, Beijing, close to the Old Summer Palace and Summer Palace. The current president is Chen Xi, a member of the CCP Politburo.

History
The school was established as the CCP's Central Committee's Marx School of Communism in Ruijin, Jiangxi, in 1933. It folded when the Chinese Red Army left on the Long March and was revived once the CCP leadership had arrived and settled in Shaanxi, northwest China, in the winter of 1936. It was then renamed the Central Party School. The school was suspended in 1947 when the CCP retreated from Yan'an. It was re-opened in 1948 in a village in Pingshan County, Hebei, before being moved to Beijing after the CCP captured the city in 1949.

In 1955, the school was re-organized so that it came directly under the jurisdiction of the CCP Central Committee. The school was abolished in 1966 during the Cultural Revolution, before being duly restored in March 1977. Since 1989, the school has been headed by the top-ranked Secretary of the Secretariat, who is concurrently a member of the Politburo Standing Committee. The day-to-day affairs of the school are in practice managed by the executive vice president, who is generally regarded to have the same ranking as a cabinet minister.

Dissent
In June 2020, Cai Xia, a retired professor of the Central Party School, criticized Xi Jinping, the CCP General Secretary. In a 20-minute audio on China social networking sites, she called Xi a "mafia boss" and the ruling Communist Party a "political zombie". She said that "everyone is Xi's slave", and there are no human rights and rule of law. She also suggested that Xi should retire from his position. On August 17, 2020, Cai was expelled from the Central Party School and her retirement pension was canceled.

Publications
The Central Party School publishes the Study Times, which provides an explanation of the relationships between the CCP Central Committee's directives and the underlying political theory and ideology.

Presidents
 Li Weihan: 1933–1935
 Dong Biwu: 1935–1937
 Li Weihan: 1937–1938
 Kang Sheng: 1938–1939
 Deng Fa: 1939–1942
 Mao Zedong: 1942–1947
 Liu Shaoqi: 1948–1953
 Kai Feng: 1953–1954
 Li Zhuoran: 1954–1955
 Yang Xianzhen: 1955–1961 
 Wang Congwu: 1961–1963 
 Lin Feng: 1963–1966 
 Hua Guofeng: 1977–1982
 Wang Zhen: 1982–1987
 Gao Yang: 1987–1989 
 Qiao Shi: 1989–1993
 Hu Jintao: 1993–2002
 Zeng Qinghong: 2002–2007
 Xi Jinping: 2007–2013
 Liu Yunshan: 2013–2017
 Chen Xi: 2017–present

See also
 Ideology of the Chinese Communist Party
 Yan'an Rectification Movement

References

External links 

 

 
Institutions of the Central Committee of the Chinese Communist Party
Universities and colleges in Haidian District
Educational institutions established in 1933
1933 establishments in China
Schools and research institutes of the Chinese Communist Party
Chinese propaganda organisations